Perfect Strangers is a television drama first aired in 2001, produced for BBC Two. It was written and directed by Stephen Poliakoff, and starred Michael Gambon, who won a British Academy Television Award for his performance, Lindsay Duncan, Matthew Macfadyen, Claire Skinner, and Toby Stephens. The drama received two Royal Television Society awards and a Peabody Award.

The action takes place during a large family reunion at a hotel.

It aired on BBC America under the title Almost Strangers.

Summary
The series is set over a three-day family reunion of considerably more than a hundred guests, that draws together the extended branches of the Symon family. Raymond Symon (Michael Gambon) reluctantly attends with his wife Esther (Jill Baker) and son Daniel (Matthew Macfadyen), who was not aware of the sprawl of his extended family because of his father Lionel's (Jay Simon) estrangement from his relatives. The stories Daniel learns about his family's past are episodic and non-linear, from his mysterious presence in a photograph taken at a children's party that he can't remember attending, to the wartime experiences of three distant elderly cousins. An important plot strand concentrates on a rift between two cousins (Claire Skinner and Toby Stephens) and their aunt (Lindsay Duncan) that has grown since the sudden death of the cousins' brother and Daniel's attempts to reunite the trio. An early incident of Raymond suffering a stroke while giving a withering speech to the reunion-goers and his subsequent bedridden state force him to appreciate the character of relatives that reflect his. Poliakoff's use of old photographs to unlock the intricacies of individuals' lives is prolific.

External links
 

SFGate review "A brilliant family plot from Britain"

2001 British television series debuts
2001 British television series endings
2000s British drama television series
2000s British television miniseries
BBC television dramas
Television series by Fremantle (company)
English-language television shows
Television shows set in England
Films directed by Stephen Poliakoff